Critical Inquiry is a quarterly peer-reviewed academic journal in the humanities published by the University of Chicago Press on behalf of the Department of English Language and Literature (University of Chicago). While the topics and historical periods it covers are diverse, the journal is known as a long-standing, highly regarded critical theory driven venue for interpretive scholarship, especially but not exclusively in literature and textual criticism. It was established in 1974 by Wayne Booth, Arthur Heiserman, and Sheldon Sacks. From 1978 to 2020, the journal was edited by W. J. T. Mitchell. Since June 2020 it is co-edited by Bill Brown and Frances Ferguson.

The journal has been called "one of the best known and most influential journals in the world" by the Chicago Tribune and "academe's most prestigious theory journal" by the New York Times.

References

External links

Journal page on publisher's  website

University of Chicago Press academic journals
Publications established in 1974
English-language journals
Quarterly journals
Critical theory